Pedro Antonio de Aragón (7 November 1611 – 1 September 1690) was a Spanish nobleman, military figure and politician who served under Kings Philip IV and Charles II of Spain. He was the  brother of Cardinal Pascual de Aragón,  Viceroy of Naples,  1664–1666.  the son of  Enrique Ramón Folch de Cardona y Córdoba.

He was born in Lucena, in what is now the Province of Córdoba. A cultured and educated man, he held different positions of high importance for the Court, acting as Viceroy of Catalonia from 1642 to 1644, as ambassador in Rome (1664–1666),  and Viceroy of Naples (1666–1671), as well as Commander in chief of Catalonia.

He claimed in 1670 the joint titles of 8th Duke of Segorbe, and 9th Duke of Cardona, after the death of his brother Luis Raimundo Folch de Cardona (January 1670) and his infant son Joaquín (March 1670), leaving only 7 daughters.

He was brought before the Justice Courts  by two of his nieces and their husbands, but he died in Madrid before the case was solved, creating some problems afterwards with the numbering of the titles of both Dukedoms since then, as apparently he had been too quick claiming "legal", self-appointed, succession to both Dukedoms.

During his period of ten years in Italy (1662–1672), he amassed a personal library of great value. Being one of the protectors and patrons of Poblet Monastery, he donated his library of approximately 3600 volumes in 1677 in exchange for being able to be buried amongst its venerated figures after his death. He sent back to Naples, from the Poblet Monastery, in 1671, the body of king Alfonso V of Aragon.

He published a book on Geometria Militar in 1671.

References 
Biblioteca del virrey Pedro Antonio de Aragón (1611-1690)
"El gobierno de las imágenes. Ceremonial y mecenazgo en la Italia española de la segunda mitad del siglo XVII"

1611 births
1690 deaths
People from Lucena, Córdoba
17th-century Spanish writers
Ambassadors of Spain to the Holy See
Dukes of Spain
Spanish politicians
Viceroys of Naples
Viceroys of Catalonia